The Black Cat group, or the Black Cats, was a pro-UNP paramilitary organization in Sri Lanka.  The Black Cats were initially formed following the electoral victory of Ranasinghe Premadasa. It was the predominant anti-communist paramilitary of the United National Party.

The group was not publicly recognized until the late 1989. It was one of the 13 death squads sponsored by the Sri Lankan government to suppress opposition during the period of the 1987–1989 JVP insurgency.

Suppression of the press

The Black Cat group killed 830 politicians who were involved in the anti-UNP newspaper of the Communist Party of Sri Lanka. These killings were only partially counted by the government due to the ongoing JVP insurgency.

Eppawela attack
The group was found guilty of a massacre in Eppawela, killing suspected JVP members and other civilians. This was said to be a retaliation attack.

References

Anti-communist organizations 
United National Party 
1987–1989 JVP insurrection 
Guerrilla organizations
Paramilitary organisations based in Sri Lanka